Thomas Throckmorton was an officer in the New Model Army who was executed in Jamaica in May 1656 for mutiny.

Thomas was the son of Sir Baynham Throckmorton, 2nd Baronet.

References

1656 deaths
New Model Army personnel
English mutineers
17th-century executions
People executed for mutiny
Executed English people
Executed military leaders